The men's 100 metres event at the 1965 Summer Universiade was held at the People's Stadium in Budapest on 25 and 26 August 1965.

Medalists

Results

Heats
Held on 25 August

Semifinals
Held on 26 August

Wind:Heat 1: +1.0 m/s, Heat 2: +1.5 m/s, Heat 3: +0.7 m/s, Heat 4: +3.3 m/s

Final
Held on 26 August

Wind: +5.0 m/s

References

Athletics at the 1965 Summer Universiade
1965